Viburnum japonicum, the Japanese viburnum, is a species of flowering plant in the family Viburnaceae. It native to Zhejiang in China, Gageodo island in South Korea, the  Ryukyu Islands, and Japan. A rounded evergreen bush reaching , with glossy leaves and strongly scented flowers, it is hardy to USDA zone 7.

References

japonicum
Flora of Zhejiang
Flora of South Korea
Flora of Japan
Flora of the Ryukyu Islands
Plants described in 1824